"Tombstone Blues" is the second song on Bob Dylan's 1965 album Highway 61 Revisited.  Musically it is influenced by the blues, while the lyrics are typical of Dylan's surreal style of the period, with such lines as "the sun's not yellow, it's chicken".

Lyrics
The lyrics fit the surreal style of the era, while being scathing of society and authority. The song contains several direct and indirect allusions to biblical characters as well as historical references. For instance to John the Baptist, to which Dylan dedicates four lines:

A live recording of the song, made for MTV in November 1994, was released on MTV Unplugged in 1995.

The song was performed by Marcus Carl Franklin and Richie Havens in I'm Not There, the film based on Dylan's life. The soundtrack version is performed solely by Havens. Two lines from the song, spoken by the "Commander in Chief" – "Death to all those who would whimper and cry" and "The sun's not yellow; it's chicken" – are spoken by a digitally manipulated Lyndon B. Johnson in another scene in the film.

Stephen King quotes from the song at the end of his first published novel Carrie. He uses the lines:

And again quotes from the song with the line "You will not die, it's not poison" in chapter eleven of the novel Gerald's Game.

References

External links
 

Songs written by Bob Dylan
Bob Dylan songs
1965 songs
Song recordings produced by Bob Johnston